m0851 is a Montreal-based company founded in 1987 by Frédéric Mamarbachi which designs and manufactures leather bags and accessories, leather jackets, and four-season outerwear. Since the beginning, m0851 has voluntarily chosen to produce locally.

History 
Founded in Montreal in 1987 under the name Rugby North America, the company started out manufacturing leather belts. Founder and owner Frédéric Mamarbachi is the creative vision behind the brand and works closely with his daughter Faye Mamarbachi, VP of Sales and Marketing.

In 2003, Rugby changed its name to m0851 to better reflect the evolution of its concept to a more refined, urban look and to enable international Trademark protection in many countries where Rugby is a popular sport. m0851 can be broken down into the first letter of the founder’s last name, Mamarbachi, and the month and year of his birth.

In 1987, the brand launches its retail operation with its first location in Montreal, on Saint-Laurent Boulevard, followed by its first U.S location in Soho, New York City, on Mercer Street. m0851 is now present in major urban hubs such as Vancouver, Toronto, Ottawa, Quebec City, Beijing, Hong Kong, Tokyo, Osaka, and Nagoya. The Los Angeles store closed in 2018.

Head Office 
Head office is located in the heart of Montreal’s Mile End district, a neighborhood with a history in the garment industry. Afterwards, this borough has increasingly been known for its artistic neighborhood and home to many artists, musicians, writers and filmmakers. Art galleries, designer’s workshops, boutiques and landmark cafés are found in this area.

m0851’s Head Office sits in a large open area loft, with the office and workshops on the same floor.

Products

Design 
m0851’s body of work includes architectural spaces, product design, and furniture. In addition to the product collections, m0851 fully designs their retail stores.

Local Production 
All m0851 products are designed in Montreal. A majority of these products are entirely conceived and crafted in their Montreal workshops, such as bags, accessories and clothing. The voluntary choice of local production allows for better quality control at all levels.

Distribution 
m0851 caters to a diverse clientele in Europe, Asia and North America through concept boutiques and E-commerce operations, and also distributes the collections through a network of retailers in various areas of the world.

References

External links
Official website

Clothing companies of Canada
Companies based in Montreal
Fashion accessory brands
Retail companies established in 1987
Leather manufacturers
1987 establishments in Quebec